The Armed Forces of the Republic of Poland (abbreviated SZ RP; popularly called Wojsko Polskie in Poland, abbreviated WP—roughly, the "Polish Military") are the national armed forces of the Republic of Poland. The name has been used since the early 19th century, but can also be applied to earlier periods.

The Armed Forces of the Republic of Poland are the Wojska Lądowe (Polish Land Forces), Marynarka Wojenna (Polish Navy), Siły Powietrzne (Polish Air Forces), Wojska Specjalne (Polish Special Forces) and Wojska Obrony Terytorialnej (Polish Territorial Defence Force) which are under the command of the Ministerstwo Obrony Narodowej Rzeczypospolitej Polskiej (Ministry of National Defence of Poland).

In 2022, Poland ranked 20th in the world in terms of military expenditures and was among the nine NATO member states that have maintained their military spending above the required 2% of annual GDP. In accordance with the Homeland Defence Act, enacted as a response to the 2022 Russian invasion of Ukraine, Poland plans to spend US$30.7 billion on its military in 2023, including the annual military budget and subsidies from the Armed Forces Auxiliary Fund (Fundusz Wsparcia Sił Zbrojnych).

Mission

Pursuant to the national security strategy of Poland, the supreme strategic goal of Poland's military forces is to ensure favourable and secure conditions for the realization of national interests by eliminating external and internal threats, reducing risks, rightly assessing undertaken challenges, and ably using existing opportunities. The Republic of Poland's
main strategic goals in the area of defence include:
 Ensuring the independence and sovereignty of the Republic of Poland, as well as its integrality and the inviolability of its borders
 Defence and protection of all the citizens of the Republic of Poland
 Creating conditions to ensure the continuity of the implementation of functions by public administration authorities and other entities competent in the area of national security, including entities responsible for running the economy and for other areas important for the life and security of its citizens
 Creating conditions for the improvement of the state's national defence capabilities and ensuring defence readiness in allied structures
 Developing partnership military cooperation with other states, especially neighbouring ones
 Implementing commitments arising from Poland's NATO and European Union membership
 Engaging in international crisis response operations led by NATO, the EU, the UN, and as a part of emergency coalitions

History

Origins and establishment
The List of Polish wars chronicles Polish military involvements since the year 972. The present armed forces trace their roots to the early 20th century, yet the history of Polish armed forces in their broadest sense stretches back much further. After the partitions of Poland, during the period from 1795 until 1918, Polish military was recreated several times during national insurrections that included the November Uprising of 1830, and the January Uprising in 1863, and the Napoleonic Wars that saw the formation of the Polish Legions in Italy. The Congress Poland, being part of the Russian Empire with a certain degree of autonomy, had a separate Polish army in the years 1815–1830, which was disbanded after the unsuccessful November Uprising. Large numbers of Poles also served in the armies of the partitioning powers, Russian Empire, Austria-Hungary and German Empire.

During World War I, the Polish Legions were set up in Galicia, the southern part of Poland under Austrian occupation. They were both disbanded after the Central Powers failed to provide guarantees of Polish independence after the war. General Józef Haller, the commander of the Second Brigade of the Polish Legion, switched sides in late 1917, and via Murmansk took part of his troops to France, where he created the Blue Army. It was joined by several thousand Polish volunteers from the United States. It fought on the French front in 1917 and 1918.

The Polish Army was recreated in 1918 from elements of the three separate Russian, Austro-Hungarian, and German armies, and armed with equipment left following World War I. The force expanded during the Polish–Soviet War of 1919–1922 to nearly 800,000 men, but then were reduced after peace was reestablished.

At the onset of World War II, on 1 September 1939 Nazi Germany invaded Poland. Polish forces were overwhelmed by the German attack in September 1939, which was followed on 17 September 1939 by an invasion by the Soviet Union. Some Polish forces escaped from the occupied country and joined Allied forces fighting in other theaters while those that remained in Poland splintered into guerilla units of the Armia Krajowa ("Home Army") and other partisan groups which fought in clandestine ways against the foreign occupiers. Thus, there were three threads to Polish armed forces from 1939; the Polish Armed Forces in the West, the Armia Krajowa and other resistance organizations fighting the Germans in Poland, and the Polish Armed Forces in the East, which later became the post-war communist Polish People's Army (LWP).

Until the fall of communism, the army's prestige under communist rule continued to fall, as it was used by the government to resettle ethnic minorities immediately after the war (Operation Vistula), and to violently suppress opposition several times, during the 1956 Poznań protests, the 1970 Polish protests, and during martial law in Poland in 1981–1983. The LWP also took part in the suppressing of the 1968 democratization process of Czechoslovakia, commonly known as the Prague Spring. That same year Marshal of Poland Marian Spychalski was asked to replace Edward Ochab as chairman of the Council of State, and General Wojciech Jaruzelski, at that time the Chief of the General Staff, was named to replace him. Jaruzelski, a known Soviet loyalist, was put in place by the Soviets in order to ensure that a trusted group of officers was in control of one of the least trusted armies in the Warsaw Pact.

Republic of Poland

After January 1990 and the collapse of the communist block, the name of the armed forces was changed to "Armed Forces of the Republic of Poland" to accord with the Polish State's new official name. Following the subsequent disbandment of the Warsaw Pact, Poland was admitted into NATO on 12 March 1999 and the Polish armed forces began a major reorganization effort in order to conform to the new western standards.

Involvement in Afghanistan (2002-2014)
From 2002 until 2014, Polish military forces were part of the Coalition Forces that participated in the ISAF mission in Afghanistan led by NATO. Poland's contribution to ISAF was the country's largest since its entrance into NATO. Polish forces also took part in the Iraq War. From 2003 to 2008, Polish military forces commanded the Multinational Division (MND-CS) located in the South-Central Occupation Zone of Iraq. The division was made up of troops from 23 nations and totaled as many as 8,500 soldiers.

Invasion of Iraq (2003)
In March 2003, the Polish Armed Forces took part in the 2003 invasion of Iraq, deploying special forces and a support ship. Following the destruction of Saddam's regime the Polish Land Forces supplied a brigade and a division headquarters for the 17-nation Multinational Division Central-South, part of the U.S.-led Multi-National Force – Iraq. At its peak Poland had 2,500 soldiers in the south of the country.

Peacekeeping missions
Other completed operations include 2005 'Swift Relief' in Pakistan, in which NATO Response Force-allocated personnel were despatched. Polish Land Forces personnel sent to Pakistan included a military engineers company, a platoon of the 1st Special Commando Regiment, and a logistics component from the 10th Logistics Brigade. Elsewhere, Polish forces were sent to MINURCAT in Chad and the Central African Republic (2007–2010).

As of 2008, Poland had deployed 985 personnel in eight separarate UN peacekeeping operations (the United Nations Disengagement Observer Force, MINURSO, MONUC, UNOCI, UNIFIL, UNMEE, UNMIK, UNMIL, and UNOMIG).

Fully professional army (2010)
Formerly set up according to Warsaw Pact standards, the Polish armed forces are now fully organized according to NATO requirements. Poland is also playing an increasingly larger role as a major European peacekeeping power in the world through various UN peacekeeping actions, and cooperation with neighboring nations through multinational formations and units such as the Multinational Corps Northeast and POLUKRBAT. As of 1 January 2010, the Armed Forces of the Republic of Poland have transitioned to a completely contract-based manpower supply system.

On 10 April 2010, a Polish Air Force Tu-154M crashed near Smolensk, Russia while in transit to a ceremony commemorating the Katyn massacre. On board the plane were the President (Commander-in-Chief), the Chief of Staff, all four Branch Commanders of the Polish Military, and a number of other military officials; all were killed.

In 2014–2015, the Armed Forces General Command and Armed Forces Operational Command were both established, superseding the previous individual service branch command structures.

Homeland Defence Act (2022)
Prompted in part by the 2022 Russian invasion of Ukraine, the Homeland Defence Act was unanimously passed by the Polish parliament on March 17, 2022 and signed into law by President Duda the following day. In accordance with the act, Poland intends to roughly double the size of the armed forces to 300,000 personnel, and to spend at least 3% of GDP on defence budget in 2023. This includes increasing the size of the tank fleet by adding approximately 1,000 new tanks and adding 600 new howitzers to Poland's ground forces. Poland's Deputy Prime Minister and Defense Minister Mariusz Blaszczak said that it is Poland's goal to build the most powerful ground forces of all the North Atlantic Treaty Organization members in Europe.

Equipment

Since 2011, the Armed Forces are in the middle of a long-term modernization program. Plans involve new anti-aircraft missile systems, ballistic missile defense systems, a Lead-In Fighter Trainer (LIFT) aircraft, medium transport and combat helicopters, submarines, unmanned aerial vehicles, as well as self-propelled howitzers. Technical modernization plans for the years 2013 through to 2022 have been put in place. During the 2013 to 2016 period of the plan, 37.8 billion PLN, or 27.8% of the period's military budget of 135.5 billion PLN was invested into technical modernisation.

Significant military equipment acquisitions are also planned for through the 2022 period, with the Ministry of Defense outlying 61 billion złoty to be spent on further modernization. A major feature of the program is the acquisition of around 1,200 unmanned aerial vehicles, including at least 1,000 with combat capabilities.

Additionally, new helicopters and air defense systems are to be procured along with five light vessels for the navy. A new submarine force is to be jointly operated with a NATO partner, and general upgrade and modernization efforts are aimed at the country's air defenses, naval forces, cyber warfare capabilities, armored forces, and territorial defense forces (to have 50,000 volunteer members).

Organization
The Polish Armed Forces consist of 325,000 active duty personnel. In 2020, troop strength in the five different branches was as follows:
 Land Forces (Wojska Lądowe): 71,200 Reserve 35,000 
 Air Force (Siły Powietrzne): 46,500
 Navy (Marynarka Wojenna): 17,000
 Special Forces (Wojska Specjalne): 3,500
 Territorial Defence Force (Wojska Obrony Terytorialnej): 32,000

All five branches are supported by:
 Military infrastructure: 25,500, including:
Ministry of National Defence of the Republic of Poland (Ministerstwo Obrony Narodowej)
 Central support
Military command
Supply and military logistics
 Military Gendarmerie (Żandarmeria Wojskowa): 4,500

Traditions

The Polish armed forces has consistently held two yearly military parades on Armed Forces Day and National Independence Day. These parades take place on Ujazdów Avenue and near the Tomb of the Unknown Soldier on Piłsudski Square respectively. The Armed Forces Day Parade was introduced in 2007 and 2008 as first grand military parades since the holiday was reinstated and have been held yearly since 2013. The first Polish military parade took place on 17 January 1945 and as of 2019, the 3 May Constitution Day parade was officially reinstated.

Marsz Generalski and Warszawianka (1831) are the main military musical pieces performed at ceremonial events. While the former is a solemn march used during inspections and the march on of the Polish flag, the latter is a march strictly used for march pasts, military parades and other processions.

The Polish Armed Forces are the only military entity in the world to use a two-finger salute which is only used while wearing a hat (it refers to the fact that the salute is given to the emblem itself) with the emblem of the Polish eagle, such as military hat rogatywka. The salute is performed with the middle and index fingers extended and touching each other, while the ring and little fingers are bent and touched by the thumb. The tips of the middle and index fingers touch the peak of the cap, two fingers supposedly meaning Honour and Fatherland (Honor i Ojczyzna).

Czołem Żołnierze (the Polish language version of Greetings Soldiers) is the official military greeting of the armed forces, usually given by the members of the government or military establishment as well as visiting dignitaries during ceremonial occasions. The soldiers will usually respond with Czołem (States title/rank of dignitary).

See also
 Polish Armed Forces (Second Polish Republic)
 Main Directorate of Information of the Polish Army (GZI WP)
 Internal Military Service (WSW)
 Border Protection Troops (WOP)
 Polish Legions (Napoleonic period)
 Polish Military Organisation
 Armia Ludowa
 Gwardia Ludowa
 Polish forces in the West
 Polish forces in the East
Anders' Army
First Polish Army (1944–1945)
Armia Krajowa

References

Citations

Sources

 
 
 Rafał Domisiewicz, Consolidating the Security Sector in Post-Conflict States: Polish Lessons from Iraq, Austrian Ministry of Foreign Affairs.
 Andrew A. Michta, Red Eagle: The Army in Polish Politics 1944–1988, Hoover Press, 1990.

Further reading
 Remigiusz Wilk, "Work in Progress", Jane's Defence Weekly, 20 August 2012

External links

 Official website of the Ministry of National Defense 
 Official website of the Polish General Staff 
 Official website of the Armed Forces Operational Command 
 Official website of the Military Gendarmerie 
 
 

Military of Poland
Permanent Structured Cooperation